Psalm 18 is the 18th psalm of the Book of Psalms, beginning in English in the King James Version: "I love you, O LORD, my strength.". In the Greek Septuagint and the Latin Vulgate, it is psalm 17 in a slightly different numbering system, known as "Diligam te Domine fortitudo mea". It is almost identical to 2 Samuel 22, although verse 1 of the psalm, I love you, O LORD, my strength, is not included in the Samuel version. With 50 verses, this is the longest psalm in Book 1 of the Book of Psalms (Psalms 1-41).

The psalm forms a regular part of Jewish, Catholic, Lutheran, Anglican and other Protestant liturgies. It was set to music by composers such as Heinrich Schütz.

Text

King James Version 
This psalm, in the English Standard Version, reads in the King James Version:

Introduction:
The LORD Is My Rock and My Fortress To the choirmaster. A Psalm of David, the servant of the LORD, who addressed the words of this song to the LORD on the day when the LORD rescued him from the hand of all his enemies, and from the hand of Saul. He said:
 I love you, O LORD, my strength.
 The LORD is my rock and my fortress and my deliverer, my God, my rock, in whom I take refuge, my shield, and the horn of my salvation, my stronghold.
 I call upon the LORD, who is worthy to be praised, and I am saved from my enemies.
 The cords of death encompassed me; the torrents of destruction assailed me;
 the cords of Sheol entangled me; the snares of death confronted me.
 In my distress I called upon the LORD; to my God I cried for help. From his temple he heard my voice, and my cry to him reached his ears.
 Then the earth reeled and rocked; the foundations also of the mountains trembled and quaked, because he was angry.
 Smoke went up from his nostrils, and devouring fire from his mouth; glowing coals flamed forth from him.
 He bowed the heavens and came down; thick darkness was under his feet.
 He rode on a cherub and flew; he came swiftly on the wings of the wind.
 He made darkness his covering, his canopy around him, thick clouds dark with water.
 Out of the brightness before him hailstones and coals of fire broke through his clouds.
 The LORD also thundered in the heavens, and the Most High uttered his voice, hailstones and coals of fire.
 And he sent out his arrows and scattered them; he flashed forth lightnings and routed them.
 Then the channels of the sea were seen, and the foundations of the world were laid bare at your rebuke, O LORD, at the blast of the breath of your nostrils.
 He sent from on high, he took me; he drew me out of many waters.
 He rescued me from my strong enemy and from those who hated me, for they were too mighty for me.
 They confronted me in the day of my calamity, but the LORD was my support.
 He brought me out into a broad place; he rescued me, because he delighted in me.
 The LORD dealt with me according to my righteousness; according to the cleanness of my hands he rewarded me.
 For I have kept the ways of the LORD, and have not wickedly departed from my God.
 For all his rules were before me, and his statutes I did not put away from me.
 I was blameless before him, and I kept myself from my guilt.
 So the LORD has rewarded me according to my righteousness, according to the cleanness of my hands in his sight.
 With the merciful you show yourself merciful; with the blameless man you show yourself blameless;
 with the purified you show yourself pure; and with the crooked you make yourself seem tortuous.
 For you save a humble people, but the haughty eyes you bring down.
 For it is you who light my lamp; the LORD my God lightens my darkness.
 For by you I can run against a troop, and by my God I can leap over a wall.
 This God---his way is perfect; the word of the LORD proves true; he is a shield for all those who take refuge in him.
 For who is God, but the LORD? And who is a rock, except our God?---
 the God who equipped me with strength and made my way blameless.
 He made my feet like the feet of a deer and set me secure on the heights.
 He trains my hands for war, so that my arms can bend a bow of bronze.
 You have given me the shield of your salvation, and your right hand supported me, and your gentleness made me great.
 You gave a wide place for my steps under me, and my feet did not slip.
 I pursued my enemies and overtook them, and did not turn back till they were consumed.
 I thrust them through, so that they were not able to rise; they fell under my feet.
 For you equipped me with strength for the battle; you made those who rise against me sink under me.
 You made my enemies turn their backs to me, and those who hated me I destroyed.
 They cried for help, but there was none to save; they cried to the LORD, but he did not answer them.
 I beat them fine as dust before the wind; I cast them out like the mire of the streets.
 You delivered me from strife with the people; you made me the head of the nations; people whom I had not known served me.
 As soon as they heard of me they obeyed me; foreigners came cringing to me.
 Foreigners lost heart and came trembling out of their fortresses.
 The LORD lives, and blessed be my rock, and exalted be the God of my salvation---
 the God who gave me vengeance and subdued peoples under me,
 who delivered me from my enemies; yes, you exalted me above those who rose against me; you rescued me from the man of violence.
 For this I will praise you, O LORD, among the nations, and sing to your name.
 Great salvation he brings to his king, and shows steadfast love to his anointed, to David and his offspring forever.

Theme

The Jerusalem Bible describes this psalm as "a triumphal ode combining a thanksgiving prayer ... with a royal victory song, ending on a messianic note".

According to Charles and Emilie Briggs in the International Critical Commentary series, this psalm borrowed material from 2 Samuel 22, which may have been written by David himself, with later additions by multiple editors adapting it for use in public worship.

This psalm is one of a number of psalms which refer to God as a "rock"  and a "fortress". 

Details in the Psalm, including the language of a watery descent to Sheol, closely match details from the Book of Jonah.

Usage

Judaism
 This psalm is recited on the seventh day of Passover in some traditions.
 Verse 32 is recited before Ein Keloheinu.
 On most days, verse 50 is recited at the end of Birkat Hamazon; on all other days, the almost identical verse from 2 Samuel 22 is recited instead.

New Testament
Some verses of Psalm 18 are referenced in the New Testament:
 Verse 2b is cited in Hebrews 
 Verse 49 is cited in Romans 15:9

Book of Common Prayer
In the Church of England's Book of Common Prayer, Psalm 18 is appointed to be read on the evening of the third day of the month.

Musical settings 
The first line of Psalm 18 was paraphrased in the German hymn "Ich will dich lieben, meine Stärke" by Angelus Silesius  in 1657. Heinrich Schütz set a metred paraphrase of Psalm 18 in German, "Ich lieb dich, Herr, von Herzen sehr", SWV 114, as part of the Becker Psalter.

References

External links 

 
 
  in Hebrew and English - Mechon-mamre
 Text of Psalm 18 according to the 1928 Psalter
 For the Leader. / I love you, LORD, my strength, LORD, my rock, my fortress, my deliverer text and footnotes, usccb.org United States Conference of Catholic Bishops
 Psalm 18:1 introduction and text, biblestudytools.com
 Psalm 18 – Great Praise from a Place of Great Victory enduringword.com
 Psalm 18 / Refrain: The Lord my God shall make my darkness to be bright. Church of England
 Psalm 18 at biblegateway.com
 Hymns for Psalm 18 hymnary.org

018
Works attributed to David